Fortunes Rocks is seaside community in Biddeford, York County, Maine, located approximately  north of Boston, Massachusetts. The 1999 novel Fortune's Rocks by Anita Shreve is loosely based on this Maine seaside neighborhood.

External links
 

Neighborhoods in Maine
Portland metropolitan area, Maine
Biddeford, Maine